Arthur James Dalladay was born on December 1894 in West Ham in Essex in England. He died in 1989 in Gravesend, Kent. Dalladay was the editor of the "British Journal Photographic Almanac & Photographer's Daily Companion" for 30 years from around 1937 to 1967.

He built the very first photographic spot meter in about 1935; he described it in the BJP Almanac of 1937 on pages 127-138. This meter still exists, in the possession of a subsequent editor of the Journal. Within a decade or so, there appeared two commercial meters based on the same principle.

Publications

 The British Journal Photographic Almanac and Photographers' Daily Companion. Published by Henry Greenwood, London, 1953.

References

External links
 The SEI Photometer: A Legend Among Spot Meters
 List of Photographic Almanacs and Annuals
 Some measurements of the stresses produced at the surfaces of glass by grinding with loose abrasives

1894 births
1989 deaths
British editors